The Wuliuan stage is the fifth stage of the Cambrian, and the first stage of the Miaolingian Series of the Cambrian.  It was formally defined by the ICS in 2018.
Its base is defined by the first appearance of the trilobite species Oryctocephalus indicus; it ends with the beginning of the Drumian Stage, marked by the first appearance of the trilobite Ptychagnostus atavus around  million years ago.

The 'golden spike' that formally defines the base of the period is driven into the Wuliu-Zengjiayan(乌溜-曾家崖)section of the Kaili formation, near Balang Village in the Miaoling Mountains, Guizhou, China.

GSSP
Three sections were discussed as GSSP candidates: the Wuliu-Zengjiayan section near Balang in Guizhou province (China), a section on Split Mountain in Nevada (USA) and the "Molodo river section" along the Molodo river (Sakha Republic, Russia). The Wuliu-Zengjiayan section is an outcrop of the Kaili Formation in the Wuliu quarry. The first candidate for the beginning of the Wuliuan was the trilobite Oryctocephalus indicus, the second candidate was the trilobite Ovatoryctocara granulata.

The Wuliu-Zengjiayan section was chosen as the formal base in 2018, with the first appearance of Oryctocephalus indicus being chosen as the defining marker for the GSSP.

References

Cambrian geochronology
Geological ages
Miaolingian